Alejandro Primo Hernández (born 10 July 2004) is a Spanish professional footballer who plays as a goalkeeper for Atlético Levante UD.

Club career
Primo was born in Valencia, and was a Levante UD youth graduate. He was a part of the reserves in the 2021–22 Segunda División RFEF, but acted only as a third-choice.

On 15 May 2022, after first team members Aitor Fernández and Dani Cárdenas were out due to a suspicion of COVID-19 and a severe gastrointestinal problem, respectively, Primo was named in the starting lineup of a La Liga match against Deportivo Alavés, as the B-team starter Pablo Cuñat were already in action with the B's and his reserve Pablo Picón did not renew his contract. He made his professional debut at the age of just 17, starting in the 3–1 home win at the Estadi Ciutat de València.

References

External links

2004 births
Living people
Footballers from Valencia (city)
Spanish footballers
Association football goalkeepers
La Liga players
Atlético Levante UD players
Levante UD footballers